Altemont Wellington (born 12 July 1934) is a Jamaican cricketer. He played eight first-class matches for Jamaica between 1965 and 1969.

References

External links
 

1934 births
Living people
Jamaican cricketers
Jamaica cricketers
Sportspeople from Kingston, Jamaica